Maupertus-sur-Mer (literally Maupertus on Sea) is a commune in the Manche department in Normandy in north-western France.

See also
 Cherbourg - Maupertus Airport
 Communes of the Manche department

References

Maupertussurmer
Populated coastal places in France